Lake Sagami Pleasure Forest or Sagamiko Resort Pleasure Forest (さがみ湖リゾート プレジャーフォレスト) formerly known as Sagamiko Picnic Land (さがみ湖ピクニックランド) is an amusement park in Sagamihara, Japan.

See also
 Lake Sagami

External links
 Sagamiko resort (Japanese)

Amusement parks in Japan
Buildings and structures in Sagamihara
Tourist attractions in Kanagawa Prefecture